Jinli is a village in the Agdam District of Azerbaijan.

References
 

Populated places in Aghdam District